The Thompson River is a tributary of the Notawassi Lake, flowing in the unorganized territory of Lac-Douaire, in the Antoine-Labelle Regional County Municipality, in the administrative region of Laurentides, in the province of Quebec, in Canada.

Forestry has always been the dominant economic activity in this sector. In the 19th century, recreational tourism activities were highlighted.

The surface of this river is usually frozen from the end of November to the end of March, except the rapids areas; however, safe traffic on the ice is generally from mid-December to mid-March.

Geography 
The Thompson River originates in Thompson Lake which is located in the territory of zec Lesueur, in the unorganized territory of Lac-Douaire. Lake Thompson is fed by the outlet (coming from the northwest) of several lakes: Rolt, Chevalier, Alida and an unidentified lake; as well as by the outlet (coming from the north) of Petit lac Thompson.

  south first, partially crossing Lake Farina;

Toponymy 
The term "Thompson" is a family name of British origin.

The Thompson river toponym was formalized on December 5, 1986, at the Place Names Bank of the Commission de toponymie du Québec.

See also 

 Baskatong Reservoir, a body of water
 Gatineau River, a stream
 Zec Lesueur, a controlled harvesting zone
 List of rivers of Quebec

References 

Rivers of Laurentides
Antoine-Labelle Regional County Municipality